Nedunkeni or Nedunkerni is a town in Vavuniya District, Sri Lanka. The roads going through Nedunkeni link Puliyankulam with Oddusuddan, and Puliyankulam with Mullaitivu.

Sri Kathirvelayutha Swami Kovil Nedunkerny

Sri Kathirvelayuthar Temple is a Hindu temple. The temple is also known as Nedunkerny Murugan and is very prestigious amongst its devotees across Vavuniya, Mullativu and Jaffna districts.

During the civilian war, the temple had been severely affected and damaged.

V/Nedunkerny Maha Vidyalayam
V/Nedunkerny Maha Vidyalayam is a school in Northern Province. V/Nedunkerny Maha Vidyalayam is situated in Nedunkeni, close to Motorbike repair.

See also
Thandikulam–Omanthai offensive
Operation Jayasikurui

Towns in Vavuniya District
Vavuniya North DS Division